Scolichthys greenwayi is a species of poeciliid found in flowing waters along the Rio Chixoy and Rio Salinas system in Alta Verapaz, Guatemala.

Being a livebearing fish greenwayi after 28 days of gestation, this species produces ten to thirty young.

The fish was named for James Greenway.

References

Wischnath, L., 1993. Atlas of livebearers of the world. T.F.H. Publications, Inc., United States of America. 336 p.

Poeciliidae
Fish of Guatemala
Taxa named by Donn Eric Rosen
Fish described in 1967